Stevan "Steva" Todorović (Novi Sad, 1832–Belgrade, 1925) was a Serbian painter and the founder of modern fencing and Sokol movement in Yugoslavia.

Biography
Todorović was born in Novi Sad and died in Belgrade. He was a correspondent and war painter for a number of domestic and foreign newspapers during the Serbian-Turkish Wars (1876–1878), and became known as the founder of war painting in Serbia. From the Balkan Wars, and later World War I, this was no longer an individual occupation but a task subject to state and military regulations.

Todorović was close to the Obrenović royal house. He made portraits of almost all members of the royal family, including Natalie of Serbia; his portrait of her helped in making her the "Serbian Mona Lisa".

He exhibited his artworks as a part of Kingdom of Serbia's pavilion at International Exhibition of Art of 1911.

In the course of his long life he created art under various visual poetics, chiefly Romanticism to Academicism. His best works were carried out in the Romantic spirit. His extensive artistic legacy consists of portraits, religious and historical paintings, landscapes, and numerous studies and drawings. Much of his artistic activities is related to Serbia and Belgrade in which cultural and social life he actively participated. He opened the first art school in Belgrade where youngsters learned drawing, singing, fencing, and gymnastic exercises. Owing to a long life and extraordinary tenacity and hard work he managed to create a rich painting opus.

Also, Stevan Todorović's work can be found in the collection of Milan Jovanović Stojimirović who bequeathed a large number of paintings, sketches, and artifacts to the Art Department of the Museum in Smederevo.

Gallery

See also
 List of painters from Serbia
 Serbian art
 Nikola Aleksić
 Đura Jakšić
 Novak Radonić
 Katarina Ivanović

References

Sources

External links

 

1832 births
1925 deaths
19th-century Serbian people
20th-century Serbian people
Serbian painters
Romantic painters
Artists from Novi Sad
Artists from Belgrade
Serbian male fencers